Yohannes Sahle (born on 1 January 1966) is an Ethiopian football manager and former player.

Playing career
Sahle played Ethiopian club football in the 1980s.

Coaching career
After his playing career he emigrated to the United States, gaining citizenship.

He returned to Ethiopia in 2010, working as technical director of the Ethiopian Football Federation. He later managed the Ethiopian under-17 national team and club side Dedebit.

He was appointed manager of the Ethiopia national team in April 2015. He was replaced by Gebremedhin Haile in May 2016.

After taking charge of the Dedebit in June 2016, he was sacked just 3 matches into the 2016–17 season. Sahle finished with a 1–1–2 record in the brief time he spent at the club.

Sahle coached Mekelle City during the 2017–18 Season, leading the team to a 4th-place finish in their debut season in the first division of Ethiopia Football, the Ethiopian Premier League, with a 13–10–7 record amassing 49 points. Sahle left the club after one year at the helm.

Sahle became the coach of Dire Dawa City  on 3 August 2018.

References

1966 births
Living people
Ethiopian footballers
Ethiopian football managers
Ethiopia national football team managers
Dire Dawa City S.C. managers
Naturalized citizens of the United States
Ethiopian emigrants to the United States
Association footballers not categorized by position